Rococo Variations may refer to:

 Variations on a Rococo Theme by Tchaikovsky
 Rococo Variations (ballet) by Christopher Wheeldon made to the Tchaikovsky Variations on a Rococo Theme